The T.E. Olmstead & Son Funeral Home is a historic commercial building at 108 South Fourth Street in Heber Springs, Arkansas.  It is a single-story stone structure, with a parapeted sloping roof.  It has a single storefront, with a recessed entry flanked by plate glass display windows.  Built in 1910, it is the city's only funeral home, and one of its early stone commercial buildings.

The building was listed on the National Register of Historic Places in 1995.

See also
National Register of Historic Places listings in Cleburne County, Arkansas

References

Commercial buildings on the National Register of Historic Places in Arkansas
Buildings and structures in Cleburne County, Arkansas
National Register of Historic Places in Cleburne County, Arkansas
Historic district contributing properties in Arkansas